Robert Patrick (born 1958) is an American actor.

Robert Patrick may also refer to:

Robert Patrick (playwright), American playwright, poet, lyricist, short-story writer and novelist
Bob Patrick, American baseball player

See also
Robert William Cochran-Patrick, Scottish politician